Hyder Ali Leghari also Haider Ali Laghari (Sindhi:حيدر علي لغاري) (b. 11 August 1934, d.25 August 2008) was a Pakistani writer and educator from Sindh, Pakistan.

Early life

According to the Encyclopedia Sindhiana by Sindhi Language Authority, Hyder Ali was born to Qamber Ali Leghari on 11 August 1934 at a village Tajpur in Matiari Taluka of Matiari District, Sindh.

Services
 Hyder Ali Leghari rendered his services as the best educationist
He had great knowledge about the poetry of Shah Abdul Latif Bhitai
 He remained the principal of government training school Hyderabad, Sindh
According to Sindhi newspaper the Affair news, he retired from service in 1994
Laghari authored two books, Andar Mulch Amulh and Kuchhan Kujaro in the Sindhi language

Death
He died on 25 August 2008.

References

Pakistani writers
Sindhi writers
Pakistani educators
Sindhi people